Torricella del Pizzo (locally ) is a comune (municipality) in the Province of Cremona in the Italian region Lombardy, located about  southeast of Milan and about  southeast of Cremona. Torricella del Pizzo borders the following municipalities: Gussola, Motta Baluffi, Roccabianca, Scandolara Ravara, Sissa Trecasali.

References

Cities and towns in Lombardy